The 2022–23 Luxembourg National Division season, also known as BGL Ligue, for sponsorship reasons, is the 108th of top-tier association football in Luxembourg. The season began on 7 August 2022 and will end on 21 May 2023. The league champion will qualify to compete in the 2023–24 UEFA Champions League.

F91 Dudelange are the defending league champions, their 16th title.

The league is notable for being one of the few top-flight leagues to use the three substitute rule for the latter half of 2022, and it is the only top-flight men's European league to do so.

Teams
Rodange 91 and RM Hamm Benfica were relegated at the end of the previous season, while Mondercange and UN Käerjéng 97 were promoted from the Luxembourg Division of Honour.

Stadia and locations

League table

Results

Statistics

Top scorers

Streaming

Almost all matches (95%+) from the 2022-23 season are streamed live on RTL.

See also
 Luxembourg Cup
 Luxembourg Division of Honour

References

External links
 

1
Luxembourg National Division seasons
Luxembourg